Þorbergur Aðalsteinsson (born 16 May 1956) is an Icelandic former handball player who competed in the 1984 Summer Olympics.

He then have been coach of the Iceland men's national handball team from 1990 to 1995

References

External links

1956 births
Living people
Thorbergur Adalsteinsson
Thorbergur Adalsteinsson
Handball players at the 1984 Summer Olympics